The Wright J65 was an axial-flow turbojet engine produced by Curtiss-Wright under license from Armstrong Siddeley. A development of the Sapphire, the J65 powered a number of US designs.

Design and development

Curtiss-Wright purchased a license for the Sapphire in 1950, with plans to have the production lines running in 1951. However a series of delays due to design changes by Curtiss-Wright, such as substituting the Sapphire's machined midsection solid forged diffuser frame with a fabricated one of welded nodular iron, led to its service introduction slipping two years. The fabricated assembly, a more practicable production job with about one fifth the cost, was subsequently adopted for the Sapphire.

Another change addressed the Sapphire's only major problem. The Sapphire was found to work well through the entire RPM range without the compressor stalling, which allowed it to dispense with inlet guide vanes or other solutions found on contemporary designs. However, in service it was found that while pressure was maintained even at low speeds and RPM, the first stages were stalling and this was causing significant vibration and fatigue issues. Wright solved this by adding inlet ramps that closed off the outer portions of the intake at low RPM. Armstrong Siddeley evaluated this for the UK Sapphires, but adopted a different solution instead.

By service introduction, the Pratt & Whitney J57 was on the market and took many of the J65's potential sales. Nevertheless, along with the Martin B-57 Canberra, its original application, the J65 went on to power versions of the North American FJ Fury, Douglas A-4 Skyhawk, Republic F-84F Thunderstreak, and the two Lockheed XF-104 Starfighter prototypes. Problems Grumman had with the engine in the F11F Tiger, particularly below-spec afterburning thrust, caused them to specify the General Electric J79 for the Grumman F11F-1F Super Tiger.

Wright T49

A  turboprop version of the J65 (Sapphire) was developed by Curtiss-Wright as the Wright T49, and a commercial derivative, the Wright TP51A2 was also designed. By this time however, the market for the engine had vanished.

Variants
J65-W-1 
J65-W-2 United States Navy (USN) variant similar to -1 producing  of thrust.
J65-W-3 
J65-B-3 Production by Buick Motor Division of General Motors Corporation, similar to -1.
J65-W-4 
J65-W-4B 
J65-W-5
J65-W-6 
J65-W-7 
J65-W-11
J65-W-12
J65-W-16
J65-W-16A 
J65-W-16C 
J65-W-18  -16A with reheat

Applications
J65
 Douglas A-4 Skyhawk
 Grumman F-11 Tiger
 Martin B-57 Canberra
 Lockheed XF-104
 North American FJ-3 Fury
 North American FJ-4 Fury
 Republic F-84F Thunderstreak

T49
 Boeing XB-47D (T49 testbed)

Specifications (J65-B)

See also

References

External links

 A 1952 advert for the Sapphire/J 65
 "Anglo-American Jewel - Engineering Details of the Wright J65 Sapphire Revealed" - a 1954 Flight article on the J65

1940s turbojet engines
J65